James Chris Cacheris (born March 30, 1933) is a former United States district judge of the United States District Court for the Eastern District of Virginia.

Education and career

Born in Pittsburgh, Pennsylvania, Cacheris was educated at University of Pennsylvania where he earned a Bachelor of Science degree in 1955. He earned a Juris Doctor in 1960 from the George Washington University Law School. Cacheris served as assistant corporation counsel from 1960 to 1962, in Washington, D.C., before entering private practice in 1962. He remained in private practice in Washington, D.C. and northern Virginia until 1971, when he became a Judge of the 19th Judicial Circuit of Virginia, Fairfax Circuit Court.

Federal judicial service

Cacheris was nominated by President Ronald Reagan on October 20, 1981, to the United States District Court for the Eastern District of Virginia, to a new seat authorized by 92 Stat. 1629. He was confirmed by the United States Senate on November 24, 1981, and received commission on December 1, 1981. He served as Chief Judge from 1991 to 1997. He assumed senior status on March 30, 1998 and was succeeded by Judge Gerald Bruce Lee. Cacheris served as a Judge of the Foreign Intelligence Surveillance Court from 1993 to 2000 and served as a Judge of the Alien Terrorist Removal Court from 2005 to 2016, serving as Chief Judge from 2006 to 2016. He retired from active service on January 26, 2018.

References

Sources
 

1933 births
Living people
Virginia lawyers
George Washington University Law School alumni
University of Pennsylvania alumni
Judges of the United States District Court for the Eastern District of Virginia
United States district court judges appointed by Ronald Reagan
20th-century American judges
Judges of the United States Foreign Intelligence Surveillance Court
Virginia circuit court judges